Naya Gaon (Nawa Graon or Nayagaon) is a small town and a Municipal council, formerly Nagar panchayat (Notified Area Committee) in the Majri Sub-Tehsil and Kharar Tehsil of District S.A.S. Nagar of Punjab State of India. Chandigarh borders Naya Gaon on two sides.
Pin code 160103

History 

Naya Gaon was founded in Circa, in 1783, as a small settlement by the battle fatigued Sikh soldiers on the way to Sri Anandpur Sahib while coming from Delhi after the conquest of Delhi Sultanate by the Sikhs, as a large section of the Sikh forces had decided to celebrate 'Hola Mahala' at Anandpur Saheb. The first settlers on this land were the Dhillon followed by the Sidhu, Nagra, Mavi, Jatts and then the Bhramins. Other working classes were subsequently brought in by the initial settlers to help in their work. Naya Gaon remained a part of Mani Majra Riasat till the independence of India. Then remained a part of District Ambala of joint Punjab. Large amounts of land belonging to Naya Gaon was acquired by the Govt. for the Chandigarh project. After the division of Punjab in 1965 it became a part of Ropar District. In the year 2006 a new district S.A.S. Nagar (Mohali) was formed and Naya Gaon became a part of Mohali district. In the 1980s people from all parts of northern India started settling in Naya Gaon due to affordable housing as compared to Chandigarh. Today it has become a conglomerate of people from states of Punjab, Haryana, Himachal Pradesh, Jammu and Kashmir, Uttrakhand, U.P., Bihar, Bengal and North Eastern States.

Governance 
Naya Gaon remained a gram panchayat till the year 2006, thereafter Notified Area Committee (NAC) Status was given and villages Nada, Karoran and Kansal were added to it. In 2017 the status was elevated to that of Municipal Council. Naya Gaon still remains the heart of the Municipal Council with the Council Office, Post Office, Police Station and Suvidha Kendra located there. It has Gobind Nagar, Dashmesh Nagar, Adarsh Nagar, Shivalik vihar, Kumaon Nagar, Vikas Nagar and Janta colony are major residential colonies. The Notified Area has 21 wards and each represented by a councillor. Nagar Kheda, Village Well, Gurdwara and Shiv Mandir are oldest known common places of Naya Gaon.

Naya Gaon is also close to the major tourist attractions in Chandigarh such as Rose Garden, PGI, Rock Garden and Lake. Besides, it is the nearest route to access hill stations like Kasauli.

References

Cities and towns in Sahibzada Ajit Singh Nagar district